is a Japanese professional basketball player who plays for Shimane Susanoo Magic of the B.League in Japan. He plays as Playmaker and is a native of Tokyo.

Ando is the first Japanese player ever to play in the National Basketball League of Canada. He started 34 games and finished the season averaging 10.4 points, 3.02 rebounds, 3.82 assists and 1.2 steals per game. After playing for the Meralco Bolts of the Philippine Basketball Association, he signed with the Link Tochigi Brex, but he did not start at all and was mostly benched by Thomas Wisman. He has inked with the "Pink" Akita Happinets.

Career statistics

|-
| align="left" | 2014-15
| align="left" | Halifax Rainmen
| 45 || 34 || 28.1 || 40.3 || 31.0 || 71.9 || 3.02 || 3.82 || 1.20 || 0 || 10.04
|-
| align="left" | 2015
| align="left" | Meralco Bolts
| 11 || 8 || 27.9 || 39.8 || 23.8 || 66.7 || 2.73 || 1.91 || 1.09 || 0 || 8.00
|-
| align="left" | 2015-16
| align="left" | Tochigi
| 25 || 0 || 6.4 || 45.2 || 38.5 || 87.5 || 0.9 || 0.8 || 0.1 || 0 ||2.3
|-
| style="background-color:#FFCCCC" align="left" | 2016-17
| align="left" | Akita
|bgcolor="CFECEC"| 60||bgcolor="CFECEC"|60  ||bgcolor="CFECEC"| 33.8 ||38.7  ||34.1  ||70.7  || 4.5 ||3.0  || 1.0 || 0 || 10.4
|-
|  align="left"  style="background-color:#afe6ba; border: 1px solid gray"  | 2017-18†
| align="left" | A Tokyo
|55||55||24.5||43.7||39.4||78.5||2.7||2.6||0.9||0.0||8.8
|-
|  align="left"  style="background-color:#afe6ba; border: 1px solid gray"  | 2018-19†
| align="left" | A Tokyo
|bgcolor="CFECEC"|60||bgcolor="CFECEC"|60||23.36||43.2||38.4||88.2||2.1||3.2||0.61||0.03||9.7
|-
|  align="left"    | 2019-20
| align="left" | A Tokyo
|41||38||26.9||42.1||28.7||76.2||2.3||4.4||1.0||0.0||11.5
|-

Playoff games

|-
| align="left" | 2014-15
| align="left" | Halifax
| 9 || || 26.4 || 30.6 || 27.0 || 71.4 || 2.8 ||3.9 ||1.0 || 0 || 7.1
|-
| align="left" | 2016-17
| align="left" | Akita
| 2 || || 34.0 || 46.2 || 58.3 || 75.0 || 3.5 ||1.5 ||1.0 || 0 || 13.5
|-
| align="left" | 2017-18
| align="left" |A Tokyo
| 5 || || 23.0 || 37.5 || 37.5 || 100 || 2.4 ||2.8 ||0.8 || 0 || 7.2
|-
| align="left" | 2018-19
| align="left" |A Tokyo
| 6 ||6 || 24.44 || 50.0 || 42.1 || 75.0 || 2.0 ||3.0 ||0.33 || 0 || 12.0
|-

Early cup games 

|-
|style="text-align:left;"|2017
|style="text-align:left;"|A Tokyo
| 3 || 3 || 22.59 || .500 || .500 || .000 || 2.0 || 2.0 || 1.33 || 0 || 5.0
|-
|style="text-align:left;"|2018
|style="text-align:left;"|A Tokyo
|2 || 2 || 27.55 || .316 || .000 || .900 || 4.0 || 4.5 || 0.5 || 0 || 10.5
|-
|style="text-align:left;"|2019
|style="text-align:left;"|A Tokyo
|2 || 0 || 23.08 || .462 || .429 || 1.000 || 3.5 || 6.0 || 2.0 || 0 || 10.0
|-

FIBA Asia Champions Cup 

|-
|style="text-align:left;"|2018
|style="text-align:left;"|A Tokyo
| 5 ||  || 24.7 || .391 || .308 || 1.000 || 1.6 || 3.4 || 1.4 || 0.0 || 8.6
|-
|style="text-align:left;"|2019
|style="text-align:left;"|A Tokyo
| 5 ||  || 20.2 || .353 || .294 || 1.000 || 1.4 || 2.6 || 1.2 || 0.0 || 7.2
|-

National team

|-
| align="left" |  2019
| align="left" | Japan
|8||  ||20.9|| .409|| .360|| .815|| 3.8||2.9 || 0.6|| 0.0|| 10.6
|-
| align="left" |  2019
| align="left" | Japan
|3||  ||21.0|| .250|| .250|| .667|| 1.3||1.3 || 0.7|| 0.0|| 3.0
|-

Trivia
As of May 2018, he puts on Adidas Dame 4 basketball shoes for the games.
He has started his gluten-free diet.

External links
Halifax Rainmen vs Island Storm Jan 18th, 2015

References

1992 births
Living people
Akita Northern Happinets players
Alvark Tokyo players
Basketball players from Tokyo
Halifax Rainmen players
Japanese men's basketball players
Utsunomiya Brex players
Meralco Bolts players
Meiji University alumni
Philippine Basketball Association imports
Point guards
Sendai University Meisei High School alumni
Sportspeople from Tokyo
Japanese expatriate basketball people in the Philippines